Creighton is a northern town in the Canadian province of Saskatchewan, named after Thomas Creighton. It had a 2016 census population of 1,402 inhabitants, down 0.3% from 1,498 inhabitants in 2011.

This town lies beside the Saskatchewan-Manitoba border, adjacent to Flin Flon, Manitoba and Flin Flon, Saskatchewan. Due to the proximity between these two communities, there is a high level of cross-border service sharing.

One of the most frequently accessed services of Flin Flon is the Flin Flon General Hospital Ambulance Service. Due to the small population of Creighton, the Government of Saskatchewan permits its residents in Creighton, Denare Beach, Sandy Bay, and Pelican Narrows to use the basic and emergency medical services of Flin Flon. The nearest Saskatchewan medical centre is in Prince Albert, 400 kilometers southwest of Creighton. In addition, though not legally exempted, Creighton and neighbouring Denare Beach informally observe Daylight saving time despite Saskatchewan's prohibition on its official use, thus keeping in sync with the community that is its primary public service resource. Flin Flon's radio and TV outlets are available in Creighton.

Northlands College maintains a campus in Creighton.

The current Mayor is Bruce R. Fidler.

Their main school is Creighton Community School and students from Creighton and Denare Beach attend school there. It is Pre-K - 12

Demographics 

See also

 List of communities in Northern Saskatchewan
 List of communities in Saskatchewan
 List of towns in Saskatchewan

References 

Division No. 18, Saskatchewan
Northern towns in Saskatchewan
Borders of Saskatchewan